The Manipur Police is the law enforcement agency for the state of Manipur in India.

Organizational structure
Manipur Police comes under direct control of Department of Home Affairs, Government of Manipur.
The Manipur Police is headed by Director General of Police (DGP) L.M khaute.

Organisation
The Manipur Police has nine operational groups  under the three main departments.
 Crime branch
 Training
 Traffic Police

Police ranks

The Manipur Police maintains the following ranks:
 Director General of Police
 Additional Director General of Police
 Inspector General of Police
 Deputy Inspector General of Police
 Superintendent of Police
 Additional Superintendent of Police
 Deputy Superintendent of Police
 Police Inspector
 Police Sub Inspector
 Assistant Police Sub Inspector
 Head Constable
 Police constable

Insignia of Manipur Police (State Police)

Notes

References

Government of Manipur
State law enforcement agencies of India
Government agencies with year of establishment missing